Fairchild is an unincorporated community in Seminole County, in the U.S. state of Georgia.

History
A post office called Fairchild was established in 1887, and remained in operation until 1913. According to tradition, the community was named after one Mr. Fairchild, a pioneer citizen. A variant name is "Fairchilds".

References

Unincorporated communities in Seminole County, Georgia